Balinci is a village in the municipality of Valandovo, North Macedonia.

Demographics
As of the 2021 census, Balinci had 366 residents with the following ethnic composition:
Macedonians 281
Serbs 82
Persons for whom data are taken from administrative sources 3

According to the 2002 census, the village had a total of 328 inhabitants. Ethnic groups in the village include:
Macedonians 242
Romani 7
Serbs 79

References

External links

Villages in Valandovo Municipality